National Institute of Technology Nagaland (NIT Nagaland or NITN) is a higher education technology institute located in Chümoukedima, Nagaland, India. It is one of the 31 National Institutes of Technology in India. NIT Nagaland was set up by the Government of India in 2009, as part of the Eleventh Five-Year Plan (2007–2012) for imparting technical education in the state of Nagaland. NIT Silchar has provided initial mentorship to NIT Nagaland for the initial two years of its establishment.

The first batch of NIT Nagaland (2010-2014) studied at NIT Silchar for two years and then the NIT Nagaland has shifted to its home state, Nagaland in September 2012. NIT Nagaland is a federally funded technical university established by an Act of the Indian Parliament.

NIT Nagaland is managed by the NIT Nagaland Society registered under the Societies Act. The institute is fully funded by the Ministry of Human Resource Development, Government of India. At present, six undergraduate courses in engineering namely electronics & instrumentation engineering, electrical & electronics engineering, electronics & communication engineering, computer science & engineering, civil engineering and mechanical engineering and four master course namely power system engineering, VLSI systems, computer science and engineering, communication engineering, MSc (physics) and integrated M.Sc. course B.S.M.S (material science) is running in the institute.

On 13 October 2012, former Union minister of human resource development, communication and information technology Kapil Sibal inaugurated the NIT Nagaland at Chümoukedima. The NIT foundation laying function was attended by chief minister Neiphiu Rio, Lok Sabha member C. L. Ruala, top officials of the state government and the union HRD ministry.

Departments and centers

Courses offered

Undergraduate

Postgraduate 
Postgraduate courses in engineering offer Master of Technology (M.Tech.) degrees. The institute also offering M.Sc. in physics courses in which students are admitted through Joint Admission Test for M.Sc.(JAM) exam.  Admissions to M.Tech. is made once a year through CCMT. Currently BSMS (Material Science) ( Integrated MSc programme  is also continuing in the institute

Integrated M.Sc Program

Ph.D

Hostels 
NIT Nagaland provides separate hostels for boys & girls. The hostels are provided with all the basic facilities a student will need including geyser facility (only during winter), 24×7 water and electricity supply, purified drinking water, water cooler. All the hostels are provided with high speed internet facility. Adequate bus facility has also been extended for commute of staff and employees staying outside the campus.

Laboratory 
NIT Nagaland is well equipped with state of art laboratories. Each department has its own laboratory and the laboratories are very well equipped with the instruments and the required lab materials.  Students are fully free to work in the laboratory depending on their grades, even they have the facility to work in the laboratory after closing hours with special permission.

Annual festival

Ekarikthin is the annual techno-cultural festival of National Institute of Technology Nagaland. It is an event usually held in the month of April every year. Ekarikthin is a Sanskrit word which means sharing the same heritage. It spans over three days and is the largest techno-cultural fest of Nagaland. It provides young nurturing talented youths a platform to show their talents in various cultural and technical events. Students from all over the Nagaland participate in this event.

References

National Institutes of Technology
Universities and colleges in Nagaland
2010 establishments in Nagaland
Educational institutions established in 2010
Science and technology in Nagaland